Lost Tracks is a compilation album by the artist Anouk released in 2001. It contains a few previously-unreleased tracks, as well as duets with other artists or tracks that had been performed live, rather than in a studio.

Reception
The album reached #1 position in the Dutch charts, and was certified Gold for selling over 35,000 copies.

Track listing
 Break Down the Wall (Original Version)
 Love (Acoustic Version For Radio 3FM)
 Don't (Remix)
 Sacrifice (String Version)
 Home Is In My Head
 Redemption (Duet with The Anonymous Mis)
 I Alone (Duet with Sarah Bettens / K's Choice – 2 Meter Sessie)
 Nobody's Wife (Reggae Version – 2 Meter Sessie)
 Lovin' Whiskey (Live)
 Last Time
 It's So Hard (2 Meter Sessie)
 Break Down The Wall (Acoustic Version For Veronica FM)
 Don't (Acoustic Version)
 In The Sand
 R. U. Kiddin' Me

Credits
Bass – Michel van Schie (tracks: 1, 3, 7, 8, 10 to 13) 
Drums – Satindra Kalpoe (tracks: 3, 5, 8, 10, 11) 
Guitar – Paul Jan Bakker (tracks: 1, 3, 7, 8, 10 to 13), Roland Dirkse (tracks: 1, 3, 7, 8, 11 to 13) 
Photography – Jos Voncken, Rob Becker 
Written-By – A. Teeuwe* (tracks: 1 to 3, 6, 8, 10 to 15), B. van Veen* (tracks: 2, 3, 6, 8, 10, 11, 13 to 15)

Charts

Weekly charts

Year-end charts

References

External links
 Album page at EMI
 Album page at Discogs including additional information about producers, musicians, and contributors on the album.

Anouk (singer) compilation albums
2001 compilation albums